Inga vera is a species of tropical tree in the family Fabaceae. It occurs in Central and South America, where it is known as churimo, guamo churimo, guamo arroyero and guamo macho.

References 

vera